Anthos may refer to:

 Anthos (play), a lost play by Athenian dramatist Agathon
 A spirit god in the fictional comic book series Guardians of the Galaxy
 Anthos, part of Google Cloud Platform
 Rosemary, also called anthos

See also 

Anthon (given name)
 Athos (disambiguation)
Antos (name)